Graceful Family is a 2019 South Korean television series starring Im Soo-hyang, Lee Jang-woo, and Bae Jong-ok. It aired on Wednesdays and Thursdays at 23:00 (KST) time slot of MBN and Dramax from August 21 to October 17, 2019.

Besides receiving critical acclaim, Graceful Family became the highest-rated drama in MBN network history at the time of its run, and currently is ranked as the second-highest rated drama of the network, after being surpassed by Bossam: Steal the Fate.

Synopsis
Mo Seok-hee (Im Soo-hyang) is the only daughter of the MC Group, a large chaebol (conglomerate). Her grandfather is the founder and majority shareholder of the chaebol and her father, Mo Cheol-hee, is the President. 15 years ago, as a young teenager, Seok-hee was forced by her father to move to the United States after her mother was murdered.

Now, 15 years later, Seok-hee has become a beautiful and intelligent woman with a strong personality. She acts tough and arrogant, but hides her kindness and suffering over her mother's death.  She comes back to Korea after learning that her grandfather is in a coma and hospitalized in Seoul in a facility owned by MC Group, evading her family’s efforts to prevent her return.

Heo Yoon-do (Lee Jang-woo) is a lawyer with no office and only a few small clients. He works by helping the residents of his neighborhood in a makeshift office at his adoptive father's restaurant. He is diligent and ethical.

Driving from the airport, Seok-hee meets Yoon-do at a police station. After a prickly first meeting, Seok-hee sees something in Yoon-do and hires him as her lawyer, and he starts working for the TOP Team at MC Group.  She finds the Mo family dysfunctional, with the President’s second wife (previously his mistress) jockeying for a position with his latest mistress, a popular but fading actress (and their young son) all living in the family compound. Also living in the compound are two sons with the second wife, the older one, Mo Wan-soo, an unsuccessful film director more interested in fast cars and wine, and the younger one, Mo Wan-joon, who is being groomed as the eventual successor, secretly hiding his transgender identity and abusing his wife (their marriage is only for show and has remained unconsummated).

The TOP Team manages the affairs of the Mo family. The TOP Team is led by Han Je-gook (Bae Jong-ok), a former judge who had previously been known to be fair and incorruptible. However, many years ago, after ruling against the MC Group in a case, in retaliation she was transferred to a court in a rural area. Disappointed, she agreed to work for the MC Group. Je-kook becomes an ambitious and treacherous woman who wants to control MC Group and exercise extensive influence over South Korean politics and business. At TOP, Je-kook works to cover up immoral or illegal (or in the case of the transgender son, simply embarrassing) behavior by the Mo family, and uncover the immoral and illegal secrets of powerful and wealthy Korean people, to blackmail or destroy them.

Coincidentally, Seok-hee and Yoon-do discover that they have a connection. Yoon-do's mother, a housekeeper for the Mo family, had 15 years ago been convicted of murdering Seok-hee's mother. Convinced that Yoon-do's mother was framed, they join forces to reveal the truth behind Seok-hee's mother's death, and the secrets that Je-kook and TOP hide as well as to help Seok-hee gain her rightful place in MC Group. They are helped by an editor and a reporter of a small newspaper and a friendly police officer but must struggle against the power and long reach of TOP. Along the way to seek justice, the group finds allies from the most unexpected places.

Cast

Main
 Im Soo-hyang as Mo Seok-hee only owner of MC group
Shin Soo-yeon as young Mo Seok-hee
 Lee Jang-woo as Heo Yoon-do/Tae-Ho
 Bae Jong-ok as Han Je-gook

Supporting
 Jung Won-joong as Mo Cheol-hee, President of MC Group
 Moon Hee-kyung as Ha Yeong-seo, Mo Cheol-hee’s former mistress and now second wife who is the head of his household
 Lee Kyu-han  as Mo Wan-soo
 Kim Jin-woo as Mo Wan-joon
 Gong Hyun-joo as Baek Soo-jin
 Jeon Jin-seo as Mo Seo-jin
 Jung Hye-in as Lee Kyung-ah

Others

 Jun Gook-hwan as Mo Wang-pyo, Seok-hee’s grandfather
 Oh Seung-eun as Choi Na-ri
 Park Hyun-sook as Jeong Yoon-sook
 Park Hye-na as Ahn Jae-rim
 Son Jin-hwan as Lawyer Yoon
 Park Sang-myun as Heo Jang-soo
 Jo Kyung-sook as Im Soon
 Na In-gyoo as Detective Oh
 Jang Seo-kyung as Go Eun-ji
 Kim Chul-ki as Yoon Sang-won
 Kwon Hyuk-hyun as Kwon Joon-hyeok
 Park Young-rin as Hwang Bo-joo-young 
 Park Chul-min as Kim Boo-gi
 Kim Yoon-seo as Oh Gwang-mi
 Jung Ho-bin as Joo Hyeong-il
 Hyun Woo-sung as Joo Tae-hyeong
 Moon Sook as "Milk Witch" (Loan shark) (Ep. 4, 16)

Reception
Graceful Family premiered with high viewership for MBN network and attracted media attention in Korea and internationally. The Maeil Business Newspaper reported the drama was sold to broadcasters in Malaysia, Indonesia, the Philippines, Taiwan, Hong Kong, Thailand, Vietnam, Myanmar and North and South America due to the quality performances of its actors and actresses, script and production of the drama.

Viewership

Notes

References

External links
  (MBN) 
  (Dramax) 
 
 

Maeil Broadcasting Network television dramas
Dramax television dramas
Korean-language television shows
2019 South Korean television series debuts
2019 South Korean television series endings
South Korean mystery television series
South Korean suspense television series
South Korean melodrama television series
Television series set in 2019
Television shows set in Seoul
Television series by Samhwa Networks